Laurel G. Bellows is the Founder and Managing Principal of The Bellows Law Group, P.C. in Chicago, Illinois. She graduated from Loyola University Chicago School of Law in 1974. 

Bellows served as president of the American Bar Association from August 2012 to August 2013. She previously chaired the ABA's Commission on Women in the Profession.  Bellows has also previously served as the head of the Chicago Bar Association.

Sources 

Year of birth missing (living people)
Living people
Place of birth missing (living people)
Lawyers from Chicago
Illinois lawyers
Loyola University Chicago School of Law alumni
Presidents of the American Bar Association